Tom McGuirk (born 2 March 1971 in San Francisco, United States) is a retired Irish athlete who specialised in the 400 metres hurdles. He represented his country at the 1996 and 2000 Summer Olympics.

His personal best in the event is 49.73 seconds set in San José, Costa Rica in 1996.

Nowadays he operates a bar in Half Moon Bay, California, with his older brother Patrick.

Competition record

References

1971 births
Living people
Track and field athletes from San Francisco
Irish male hurdlers
American male hurdlers
Olympic athletes of Ireland
Athletes (track and field) at the 1996 Summer Olympics
Athletes (track and field) at the 2000 Summer Olympics
World Athletics Championships athletes for Ireland
People from Half Moon Bay, California